Underground Ernie is a 2006 British computer animated educational children's television series produced by Joella Productions for the BBC on both CBeebies and BBC Two, and sold internationally by BBC Worldwide. It is set in International Underground, a fictional worldwide underground railway network, based on the London Underground, and focuses on the everyday adventures of Ernie, a friendly underground supervisor, Millie, his multilingual colleague, and Mr. Rails, the lovable maintenance man.

The locomotives under Ernie's watchful eye all have characters of their own. There is Bakerloo, Victoria, Circle, Jubilee and the twins, Hammersmith & City. From time to time they are joined by their friends from across the world including; Paris, Brooklyn, Moscow, Sydney and Osaka.

The show is aimed at children between the ages of three and eight years old. The initial (one and only, so far) series had twenty six episodes, lasting twelve minutes each. In October 2005, the series was officially announced, with it premièring the following year. Its first showing on was on Monday 5 June 2006 on BBC Two at 9:00am. It later premiered on CBeebies until 23 December 2006.

Creation
Writer John Deery and musician Sid Rainey, formerly of the band Compulsion, formed a production company in 2000 by the name of Joella Productions. During a brainstorming session, Sid came up with the idea of a children's TV series based on the names of tube stations, which is how Underground Ernie was born.

Premise
The series is focused on the adventures of Ernie, the controller of International Underground. He works with his colleagues, computer expert Millie who loves all things international, and Mr Rails, the maintenance man who's been working at the railway for over 25 years. The trains have their own characters too. Bakerloo is the detective of the Underground, while Hammersmith and City are two fast and furious twins who love quizzes and banking. Victoria is the oldest and has seen it all. She acts as a grandmother figure to all the trains, offering a helping hand whenever they need guidance, and Circle is the hippy chick, who loves nature and animals, as well as helping her friends out. Jubilee is the youngest of the team, and he's gadget mad, as well as being very mischievous. Over the course of the series, they are joined by their friends from across the world, such as the snooty Paris, gentle giant Moscow and fun-loving Brooklyn. In each episode, Ernie comes across a problem that he needs a fix, needing the help of the trains or passengers, or both.

Premiere
In its premiere run, Underground Ernie was broadcast twice a day five days a week, firstly on BBC Two at 9 am, and then repeated on CBeebies at 4.30 pm.

In the series premiere, "Pop Decoy", pop superstar "Sam 7" is performing at the theatre, and Jubilee has to get him there without hundreds of fans finding out. Alas, the excitable Jubilee can't keep a secret, and he and Ernie have to come up with a plan to get Sam 7 safely to the theatre.

Production
At one point during production, Canadian-based distributor Fremantle Corporation was involved in the distribution.

Design
All the visuals for the show are produced using CGI computer graphics, and that largely explains the high cost of the production (£4 million) . The first series was produced using LightWave 3D software.

Some critics have pointed out the similarities between Underground Ernie and Thomas the Tank Engine and Friends, in that all 2 series feature anthropomorphic locomotives. Whilst acknowledging a similarity, the producers make it clear that this is very different from Thomas, and is very much based in the twenty first century. Despite being underground metro trains, they often travel overground through the open countryside to various stations, including a seaside resort.

The overall design is inspired by the real London Underground, and Transport for London has allowed the series to use design elements directly taken from their brand, in particular the use of their distinctive Underground logo, or 'roundel' as it is known.

3D Films (who previously animated another series called Wheels on the Bus) is responsible for the animation provided, even though both Joella Productions and 3D Films had a bad relationship during production.

Characters

Humans
 Underground Ernie is the eponymous supervisor who owns the International Underground station (voiced by ex footballer and television sports presenter Gary Lineker).
 Millie (voiced by Emma Weaver) is a computer expert working on the network, and the co-owner of the station.
 Mr. Rails (voiced by Howard Ward) is the maintenance man.
 Dan and Sam (voiced by Chris Jarvis and Tim Whitnall) are Ernie's mischievous nephews, They like to cause a lot of trouble around the international underground.

Trains
The majority of the characters are trains, most of which take their names from the lines of the London Underground network, although in Underground Ernie's world, it is called "International Underground".

 Victoria (voiced by Janet Brown) is the oldest train, and is like a mother to the other trains. She wears a crown, to suggest the link between herself and Queen Victoria, but visually appears more like a caricature of the former Queen, Elizabeth II. Although Victoria is presented as the oldest character in the series, the Victoria line in real life is actually one of the newest lines – only the Jubilee line, opened in 1979, is newer.
 Bakerloo (voiced by Howard Ward) is an eccentric and has a deerstalker hat similar to that of Sherlock Holmes (the Bakerloo line used to terminate at Baker Street, where the fictional detective lived at number 221b) but has a profile resembling that of the Duke of Wellington, the victor of the Battle of Waterloo, after the Waterloo Underground station (Bakerloo is short for Baker Street & Waterloo Railway).
 Hammersmith (voiced by Tim Whitnall) is twin brother to City, a fast and furious train who is a general knowledge "whizz". He wears blue spectacles. 
 City (voiced by Chris Jarvis) is Hammersmith's twin brother, and is also fast and furious, but is an expert in mathematics and finances (presumably a reference to the City, where many of the banks and financial businesses in London and the United Kingdom are based). He wears pink spectacles. Hammersmith and City are usually coupled back end to back and travel together as one train. 
 Jubilee (voiced by Tim Whitnall) is the youngest train, and is into computers, music, internet, emails, games, and all the latest gadgets and technology. He can be mischievous, but is still well liked.
 Circle (voiced by Chris Jarvis) is a "hippy chick"—always helpful and rarely loses her cool.

There are also five international trains, which Millie visits when she goes abroad every weekend. She always bring back exciting stories for Ernie, as well as a souvenir:
Brooklyn (voiced by Howard Ward) is from New York City, is decked out in the American Stars and Stripes.
Sydney (voiced by Emma Weaver) is from Australia, always wants to go to the beach.
Moscow (voiced by Howard Ward) is from Russia. He is strong, fast and likes to clear snow off the tracks. He often uses the wrong word when trying to use various English phrases, such as saying "as fit as a fishcake" instead of "as fit as a fiddle".
Paris (voiced by Chris Jarvis) is from France. He's snooty, but kind.
Osaka (voiced by Tim Whitnall) is from Japan, and has a super-speed booster. He is decked out in a Rising Sun decorated bandana.

Episodes
In each twelve minute episode Ernie faces a problem, which he needs to fix with the help of the trains. This will typically involve one of the locations on International Underground or visitors coming via the Underground, often both.

Broadcast
Channel 4 were originally slated to show the series, but after a lot of deliberation, the BBC brought the rights to the series in 2005. In its premier run, Underground Ernie would be broadcast at 9am on BBC 2, followed by a repeat on the CBeebies channel at 4:30pm that afternoon.

BBC 4 showed an episode as part of their themed "Tube Night" on 18 March 2007.

Merchandising

Toys
In November 2005, Halsall International Ltd. announced that they had secured the rights to produce merchandising linked to Underground Ernie . The products became on sale by September 2006, with a comprehensive range being available in 2007. The use of London Underground names and trains is a deliberate step to lead into merchandising suitable for children's gifts the revenue, from which were shared with Transport for London. Halsall International Ltd have, since 2009, have stopped making 'Underground Ernie' models.

From 2007 up until 2009, Bachmann produced an HO scale Underground Ernie range, which was discontinued after the show was taken off air.

DVDs
Warner Vision International released four compilation DVDs of the show, which were later compiled into a boxset forming the complete first series. These releases are now out of print, and are very hard to find.

Day Out with Underground Ernie
In 2008, one railway in Hampshire called the Eastleigh Lakeside Steam Railway secured the rights to hold children's days involving Underground Ernie, and held four Underground Ernie events a year called: Day Out with Underground Ernie.

Miniature versions of 'Jubilee' and 'Ernie 1' were created which passengers could ride behind, as well as meeting a larger than life version of Underground Ernie. The last Ernie event was held during late December 2009, ending in early January 2010. Day out with Thomas took over where it left off.

Underground Ernie charity evenings
As well as Days Out with Ernie, in 2008 and 2009, two Underground Ernie fundraising events were held at the railway which were hosted by The Karen Ingram Foundation With over £3,500 raised on the night at the first event, which raised money for the hospital which cared and looked after Karen Ingram, for whom the events were in memory of. Co creator John Deery also attended the special charity evening, along with his family.

With Eastleigh no longer hosting events involving Days Out with Ernie, a final fundraiser was held at the railway in 2010, however this was not themed to Ernie, due to the railway no longer having the Ernie characters available to use.

Theme song
The show's theme song, performed by members of The Wonder Stuff under the name "HRB Music", is called "The Importance of Being Ernie". This is a reference to Oscar Wilde's play The Importance of Being Earnest (Ernie is short for Ernest).

Future
A second series has been on the cards since 2006. Co-creator John Deery has been seeking a £5.5 million investment in a bid to break the US market, with funds raised from that going towards making a second series. This hasn't happened yet, however.

According to creative director Adam Batham, the strained relationship between 3D Films and Joella Productions prevented another series from being made.

References

External links 

 Underground Ernie website
 Underground Ernie Facebook Page
 Underground Ernie Twitter Page
 
 
 Gary Lineker talks about his role as Underground Ernie – audio option
 Joella Productions website
 Transport for London website
 TfL article about Underground Ernie
 Article about merchandising and children's TV which mentions Underground Ernie
 Article about Underground Ernie
 BBC News item about the new series
 BBC Programme copy
 BBC Press Office interview with Gary Lineker about Underground Ernie
 Toys and Playthings article about merchandising for Underground Ernie
 An MPEG clip of the show

BBC children's television shows
British children's animated adventure television series
British children's animated comedy television series
British children's animated fantasy television series
British computer-animated television series
2006 British television series debuts
2009 British television series endings
Works set on the London Underground
2000s British animated television series
2000s British children's television series
CBeebies